Margaret Murray Washington (March 9, 1865 - June 4, 1925) was an American educator who was the principal of Tuskegee Normal and Industrial Institute, which later became Tuskegee University. She also led women’s clubs. She was the third wife of Booker T. Washington. She was inducted into the Alabama Women's Hall of Fame in 1972.

Biography
Margaret Murray was born on March 9 in Macon, Mississippi, in the early 1860s. Her birth year is unknown; her tombstone says she was born in 1865, but the 1870 census lists her birth year as 1861. She was one of ten children born to sharecroppers; an Irish immigrant father and a black American mother, a washerwoman and possibly former slave. Her father died when she was seven, and the next day she moved to live with a Quaker couple by the name of Sanders. They encouraged her to become a teacher, one of the few occupations available to women at the time.

As a child, Murray spent much of her time reading and quickly excelled in school. By the age of fourteen, she was so advanced in her studies that the school offered her a teaching position. Determined to further her teaching career, at the age of nineteen, Murray enrolled in Fisk University, where she completed the college preparatory course in five years and college in four.

Marriage
It was at Fisk that Murray first met Booker T. Washington. Regarding her as a model student, Washington asked her to take over the position of lady principal, formerly held by his deceased second wife. By 1890, Murray was writing to Washington to express her deep feelings for him. He proposed the following year and, after some hesitation, Murray accepted Washington's proposal and they were married in 1893. Murray and Washington shared a home with Washington's relatives and his children from his previous marriage until they moved into The Oaks, the homestead which the Tuskegee Institute built for their family in 1901. Washington was reluctant to share his feelings with Murray, and often left her to tend his children while he was away on business. Though Washington never got over the loss of his first two wives, he believed that Margaret provided a well-ordered household, and the two were generally happy with their marriage. Margaret wrote Washington's speeches and she helped her husband in expanding the school and traveled with him on his tours and speaking engagements.

Career
In 1890, Murray was hired as lady principal of Tuskegee Institute. In this role, she was responsible for supervising women students and supporting women on Tuskegee's faculty. She established the women's division curriculum for the lower and post-graduate division in sewing, laundering, millinery, soap-making, table-setting, cooking, and broom-making.

During her tenure as lady principal of Tuskegee, she also created the Tuskegee Woman's Club. A significant endeavor of the Woman's Club was the restoration of the Elizabeth Russell plantation, located eight miles outside of Tuskegee. the place was described by Washington as an area populated with former convicts, where children were undisciplined and the homes were unkempt. For twelve years, she alongside other social reformers in Tuskegee sought to rehabilitate this community through the strengthening of family structures. Implementing Tuskegee's "Bath, Broom, and Bible" program, she centered her social-uplift theory around improving motherhood and wifehood.

The Tuskegee Woman's Club later merged local organizations with women clubs to help improve the values and liberation of womanhood in black women of the Jim Crow south. In 1895 she gave an influential speech titled "Individual Work for Moral Elevation" at the First National Conference of the Colored Women of America was elected President of the newly-established National Federation of Afro-American Women. As President, Washington insisted that the thrust of the organization be "industrial training and practical housewifery." This differed from some women's clubs in the North, such as the Colored Women's League of Washington, D.C. headed by Mary Church Terrell which refused to join the newly-formed National Federation of Afro-American Women   She is credited with co-founding the National Association of Colored Women in 1896. She founded country schools, taught women how to live and attend to their homes, worked for the improvement of prisons, started the Mt. Meigs School for boys and an industrial school for girls at Tuskegee, and constantly worked for the betterment of the poor and neglected. In 1912, she became the fifth president for the National Association of Colored Women.

After the death of her husband in 1915, Washington worked to improve the educational system for black Americans. She became deeply involved in domestic education for mothers in Tuskegee and in supporting schools for children at surrounding plantations.

As with the programs advocated by her husband, Margaret Murray Washington focused on domestic and vocational education. She became involved in interracial cooperation and participated in the path-breaking Memphis Women's Inter-Racial Conference in 1920.

Death
Margaret Murray Washington remained at The Oaks until her death in 1925. She is buried in the university cemetery, next to her husband.

Legacy
In 1972, Washington was inducted into the Alabama Women's Hall of Fame.

M.M. Washington Career High School in Washington, DC  was named in her honor. The school closed in 2008. Also named for her is a building on the Tuskegee campus.

Washington appears as a character in the 2020 Netflix miniseries Self Made, played by Kimberly Huie.

Anti-lynching activist 
Around the turn of the century, many black people of the south were being targeted as victims of lynching. With the increasing numbers of lynching going on with blacks many organizations started to form during this period. In 1895 a large group of black women formed the National Federation of Afro-American Women, and Margaret Murray was elected the president.

This organization did an array of jobs from helping women in the south that were trying to buy a house to opening day care giving women an opportunity to go to work. The union of the NFAA and the Washington Colored League formed the National Federation of Afro-American Women. Washington was a firm believer that many racial issues could be fixed through interracial cooperation. She believed that not everyone was out to harm people of color.

In 1920 a National Association of Colored Women Conference was held in Tuskegee, Alabama. The main topic on the agenda was lynching. Many of the recently founded anti-lynching organizations in attendance expressed their support in a bill that defined lynching as an act of "murder", and that the killer had to suffer repercussions for their actions. Two important white women in attendance, Carrie Parks Johnson and Sara Estelle Haskins, from the Southern Methodist Women's Committee, were invited to Washington's home. Both women were surprised at the huge number of highly educated black middle class women there.

Quotes
 "If we wish to help each other let us not only praise ourselves, but also criticize. Plain talk will not hurt us."
 "Praise a child always and he will soon get the point to where he thinks it is impossible for him to make mistakes."
 "We cannot separate ourselves from our people, no matter how much we try; for one, I have no desire to do so."
 " The condition of our race, brought about by slavery, the ignorance, poverty, intemperance, ought to make use women know that in half a century we cannot afford to lose sight of the large majority of the race who have not ,as yet, thrown off the badge of the evils with which I mentioned."

Selected works

Notes

References
 Washington, Margaret Murray (1865-1925) | The Black Past: Remembered and Reclaimed

External links
 "We Must Have a Cleaner Social Morality" (1898 speech) at BlackPast.org
 History of Margaret Murray Washington Career High School, Washington, D.C.

Further reading
 Linda Rochell Lane, A Documentary of Mrs. Booker T. Washington. Edwin Mellen Press, 2001. .
 Sheena Harris, Margaret Murray Washington: The Life and Times of a Clubwoman. University of Tennessee Press, forthcoming 2021. .

1860s births
1925 deaths
American academic administrators
American anti-lynching activists
Tuskegee University
Women academic administrators
Presidents of the National Association of Colored Women's Clubs
People from Macon, Mississippi
Activists from Mississippi
Activists from Alabama
American people of Irish descent
Booker T. Washington
American women educators
Educators from Mississippi
Educators from Alabama
American people of African descent